Harry Skipper (born April 2, 1960 in Baxley, Georgia) was a football player in the CFL for seven years. Skipper played defensive back for the Montreal Concordes and Saskatchewan Roughriders from 1983–1989. He played college football at the University of South Carolina.
He now coaches football and track for Thomas County Central High, he also coached wrestling helping four students place 3rd, 4th, 5th, and 6th respectively in state in a 3-year span which is unheard of for this small town school.

References

1960 births
Living people
South Carolina Gamecocks football players
Montreal Concordes players
Saskatchewan Roughriders players
American players of Canadian football
Canadian football defensive backs
People from Baxley, Georgia
Players of American football from Georgia (U.S. state)